The Apostolic Exarchate of Łemkowszczyzna was a short-lived missionary pre-diocesan jurisdiction (exempt, i.e. immediately subject to the Holy See) of the Ukrainian Greek Catholic Church (Byzantine Rite in Ukrainian language), which was created as the Apostolic Administration of Łemkowszczyzna and then promoted as an Apostolic Exarchate.  The erection of the jurisdiction was in response to the question of the national character of the Lemko people, a dispute between a pro-Ukrainian party and a Lemko nationalist party.  The Eparchy of Przemyśl was pro-Ukrainian while the Polish government was opposed to Ukrainianization.  Of a population of 140,000, more than 18,000 Lemko nationalists joined the Orthodox Church in opposition to the Przemyśl Eparchy.  At the demand of the Polish government and to curtail losses to the Orthodox, the Holy See established a separate Apostolic Administration for the Lemkos.  Poland's defeat and occupation in 1939 allowed for the appointment of the pro-Ukrainian Msgr. Oleksandr Malynovskyi as leader of the jurisdiction when a vacancy occurred in 1941.

Timeline 
 February 10, 1934: Established as the Apostolic Administration of Łemkowszczyzna on territory of the 9 western deaneries, that split off from the Ukrainian Catholic Eparchy of Przemyśl, Sambir and Sanok.
 February 1941: Promoted as the Apostolic Exarchate of Łemkowszczyzna.
 De facto abolished (suppressed) by the Polish Communist government after the expulsion of Ukrainians from Poland to the Soviet Union in 1944–1945 and Operation Vistula in July 1947.
 January 16, 1991: Officially suppressed and its territory merged into the Ukrainian Catholic Eparchy of Przemyśl.

Apostolic Administrators and Apostolic Exarches 

 Apostolic Administrators of Łemkowszczyzna  
 Fr. Vasyl Mastsiukh (November 17, 1934 – death March 12, 1936)
 Fr. Yakiv Medvetskyi (July 3, 1936 – death January 27, 1941)
 Msgr. Oleksandr Malynovskyi (February 5, 1941 – February 1941 see below)

 Apostolic Exarch of Łemkowszczyzna  
 Msgr. Oleksandr Malynovskyi (see above February 1941 – September 1945) (later Vicar general for the Ukrainians in Great Britain)

Source and External links 
 GCatholic.org information on the Apostolic Exarchate
 Profile at Catholic Hierarchy 
 Shematismus of the Apostolic Exarchate (Ukrainian)

References

Lemkowszczyzna
Christian organizations established in 1934
Lemko Region